Tegami is the Japanese word for "letter" , as well as the Italian pluralised form of the word for "frying pan". Tegami may refer to:

Music
, a 2008 song by Angela Aki
, a 1995 song by The Boom
, a 2008 song by Bright
, a 2008 song by Ryoichi Higuchi; see 51st Japan Record Awards
, a 2004 song by Hiromi Iwasaki
, a 2001 song by Ketsumeishi
, a 1994 song by Kome Kome Club
, a 2008 song by Hanako Oku
, a 1970 song by Saori Yuki

Other
, a shōnen manga series by Hiroyuki Asada
, a 2003 novel by Keigo Higashino
, a 2006 Japanese movie starring Erika Sawajiri and Takayuki Yamada

See also 
 Tagami (disambiguation), a similar-sounding word